Hrib pri Rožnem Dolu is a small settlement in the hills west of Rožni Dol in the Municipality of Semič in Slovenia. The area is part of the historical region of Lower Carniola. The municipality is now included in the Southeast Slovenia Statistical Region.

Name
The name Hrib pri Rožnem Dolu means 'Hrib near Rožni Dol', distinguishing it from other settlements named Hrib. The name Hrib (from the common noun hrib 'hill') is common in Slovenia, referring to the local geography.

References

External links
Hrib pri Rožnem Dolu at Geopedia

Populated places in the Municipality of Semič